Proctoporus optimus is a species of lizard in the family Gymnophthalmidae. It is endemic to Peru, in montane ecosystems.

References

Proctoporus
Reptiles of Peru
Endemic fauna of Peru